Ulnar collateral ligament injury or UCL injury may refer to:
Ulnar collateral ligament injury of the elbow
Ulnar collateral ligament injury of the thumb